Jim Mutimer is a former association football player who represented New Zealand at international level.

Mutimer played three official A-international matches for New Zealand in 1951, the first two against New Caledonia, the first a 6–4 win on 22 September, followed by a 0–2 loss two days later on 24 September. His third and final official international was a 6–4 win over Fiji on 7 October 1951, Mutimer scoring his only international goal in that game

References 

Year of birth missing (living people)
Living people
New Zealand association footballers
New Zealand international footballers
Association football forwards